The Viking Open was a golf tournament on the Swedish Golf Tour and the Challenge Tour in 1990 and 1991. It was played in Kode, Kungälv Municipality, 30 km north of Gothenburg, Sweden.

The tournament was held at Kungälv-Kode Golf Club, on a course just completed in June 1990, including a signature 660 m par-6 hole.

Winners

References

External links
Coverage on the Challenge Tour's official site

Former Challenge Tour events
Swedish Golf Tour events
Golf tournaments in Sweden